Nanpakal Nerathu Mayakkam, officially titled in English as Like An Afternoon Dream, is a 2023 Indian Malayalam-Tamil bilingual drama film directed by Lijo Jose Pellissery and written by S. Hareesh from a story by Pellissery. It was jointly produced by Mammootty and Pellissery. The film stars Mammootty, Ramya Suvi, Ramya Pandian and Ashokan and threads on insomnia, spiritualism, and fantasy.

Nanpakal Nerathu Mayakkam was released theatrically on 19 January 2023 and received critical acclaim, with praise towards the direction, writing and the performances of the cast (especially Mammootty).

Plot

The film portrays some incidents in James's life. After visiting Velankanni, Tamil Nadu, a group of Malayali tourists take a bus back to Kerala. James stops the bus at a village in rural Tamil Nadu while the tourists snooze. James enters into a house nearby, and starts acting like a member of the family living in the house. He behaves like a Tamilian and speaks in Tamil like a local of the area. It confuses everyone who travelled with him as well as the local people of the village. Eventually the people realise he has taken on the character, mannerisms and language of Sundaram, a member of the family who had disappeared two years earlier. James has knowledge of the village and villagers that only Sundaram would have known. James/Sundaram grows confused at the apparent sudden changes in the village, such as a temple being built that had not started construction when Sundaram went missing. James' family and friends plot how to drug him in order to return him to Kerala and get him treatment for his presumed mental disorder. However after falling asleep, James regains his true identity and willingly goes with them to return home.
In the end, it is shown that Sundaram's character was merely a dream. Or was that a dream?

Cast

Production
On 7 November 2021, Lijo Jose Pellissery officially announced the film by sharing the title through social media.
Nanpakal Nerathu Mayakkam is the first-time collaboration between Mammootty and Lijo Jose Pellissery. The film is produced by Mammootty himself under the newly launched production house, Mammootty Kampany.

On 7 November 2021, principal photography took place in Manjanaickenpatti Village, Near Palani, Tamil Nadu. Filming was wrapped up on 7 December 2021.

Release
The movie premiered at 27th International Film Festival of Kerala(IIFK) on 12 December 2022. The film received positive reviews and huge demand for world premiere. Audience praised both Mammootty and Lijo Jose Pellissery.

On January 19, 2023, Nanpakal Nerathu Mayakkam went into general release on theatres.

Home media 
The streaming rights of the film were sold to Netflix. It released on 23 February 2023.

Reception 
Nanpakal Nerathu Mayakam received positive reviews from critics and audience alike.

Anna M. M. Vetticad of Firstpost gave the film 3 out of 5 and wrote "Apart from the music and sound design, the highlight of Nanpakal Nerathu Mayakkam is its immersive central performance...the thespian does not give either James or Sundaram any quirks, yet masterfully conveys their divergent personalities leaving us in no doubt as to who is who and when. This team-up with Lijo confirms that Mammootty is steering his career into a whole new experimental phase, embracing not just the sort of middle-of-the-road, slice-of-life ventures that have endeared Malayalam cinema to a pan-India audience, but also entering an unapologetically philosophical arena."

Prem Udayabhanu of Onmanorama reviewed the film as post-siesta drama a lofty cinematic experience and wrote "The orchestrated chaos we see in Jallikattu or Churuli is amiss. But through the interplay of hallucination and trance Lijo’s scriptwriter S Harish infuses into Mammotty’s character, the master craftsman pulls the actor and the audience to a lofty plain of cinematic excellence. We cannot but embrace this irrational reel exuberance."

Analysing the movie, Sajesh Mohan of Onmanorama wrote In ‘Nanpakal Nerathu Mayakkam’, Lijo Jose Pellissery must have asked cinematographer Theni Eswar to observe the actors like a master of mindfulness. For that's what his camera does. The shots are static yet the frames are dynamic and once the film enters Sundaram’s village through James's siesta dream, the shots acquire an aura that makes it resemble the visualisations of a Tao master. In lieu of adding haze and glow or grading the dream sequence differently, Theni Eswar achieves a differentiation relying on the aesthetic method of frames within a frame.

Manoj Kumar R. of The Indian Express rated the film 3.5 out of 5 and wrote "The visuals are almost meditative. Every frame tells more than one story."

Accolades

References

External links 

2023 films
2023 drama films
Indian drama films
2020s Tamil-language films
2020s Malayalam-language films
Indian multilingual films